Péter Takács (born 29 June 1973) is a Hungarian fencer. He competed in the team sabre event at the 2000 Summer Olympics.

References

External links
 

1973 births
Living people
Hungarian male sabre fencers
Olympic fencers of Hungary
Fencers at the 2000 Summer Olympics
Fencers from Budapest